Pseudidonauton chihpyh is a species of moth of the family Limacodidae. It is found in Taiwan at altitudes between 400 and 500 meters.

The wingspan is about 14 mm for males and 19 mm for females. Adults have a pale brown ground colour. The forewings have a basal dark area, defined by a whitish distal border. Adults have been recorded in early April and the first half of June.

Etymology
The species name is derived from one of the localities: Chihpen Hot Springs.

References

Limacodidae
Moths described in 2009
Moths of Taiwan